In economics and finance, exponential utility is a specific form of the utility function, used in some contexts because of its convenience when risk (sometimes referred to as uncertainty) is present, in which case expected utility is maximized. Formally, exponential utility is given by:

Note that the additive term 1 in the above function is mathematically irrelevant and is (sometimes) included only for the aesthetic feature that it keeps the range of the function between zero and one over the domain of non-negative values for c.

The exponential utility function is a special case of the hyperbolic absolute risk aversion utility functions.

Risk aversion characteristic

Exponential utility implies constant absolute risk aversion (CARA), with coefficient of absolute risk aversion equal to a constant:

In the standard model of one risky asset and one risk-free asset, for example, this feature implies that the optimal holding of the risky asset is independent of the level of initial wealth; thus on the margin any additional wealth would be allocated totally to additional holdings of the risk-free asset.  This feature explains why the exponential utility function is considered unrealistic.

Mathematical tractability

Though isoelastic utility, exhibiting constant relative risk aversion (CRRA), is considered more plausible (as are other utility functions exhibiting decreasing absolute risk aversion), exponential utility is particularly convenient for many calculations.

Consumption example

For example, suppose that consumption c is a function of labor supply x and a random term : c = c(x) + .  Then under exponential utility, expected utility is given by:

where E is the expectation operator.  With normally distributed noise, i.e.,

E(u(c)) can be calculated easily using the fact that

Thus

Multi-asset portfolio example

Consider the portfolio allocation problem of maximizing expected exponential utility  of final wealth W subject to

where the prime sign indicates a vector transpose and where  is initial wealth, x is a column vector of quantities placed in the n risky assets, r is a random vector of stochastic returns on the n assets, k is a vector of ones (so  is the quantity placed in the risk-free asset), and rf is the known scalar return on the risk-free asset.  Suppose further that the stochastic vector r is jointly normally distributed.  Then expected utility can be written as

Maximizing this is equivalent to minimizing

which in turn is equivalent to maximizing

Thus we wish to maximize the following with respect to the choice vector x of quantities to be placed in the risky assets:

This is an easy problem in matrix calculus, and its solution is

From this it can be seen that (1) the holdings x* of the risky assets are unaffected by initial wealth W0, an unrealistic property, and (2) the holding of each risky asset is smaller the larger is the risk aversion parameter a (as would be intuitively expected). This portfolio example shows the two key features of exponential utility: tractability under joint normality, and lack of realism due to its feature of constant absolute risk aversion.

See also
Entropic risk measure
Isoelastic (power) utility function

References

Financial risk modeling
Utility function types